St. Mary Parish is a Roman Catholic church in Bridgeport, Connecticut, part of the  Diocese of Bridgeport.

History 

Before April 1857 the East of Bridgeport Catholics were attended by the priests of St. James Church, first parish in the city and predecessor of St. Augustine’s.  St. James was located at Washington Avenue and Arch Street and had been dedicated July 24, 1843 – 13 years after a missionary priest had first celebrated Mass in Bridgeport and several months before the Diocese of Hartford was created. At this time St. James had parish boundary lines including an area greater than today's Diocese of Bridgeport.

Rev. Thomas J. Synott, third priest to serve St. James and second pastor, in 1854 decided to build the first St. Mary Church on Crescent and Church Streets where St. Cyril’s now stands. It was a white wooden frame church. Their first parishioners were from Ireland.
 
In April 1857 St. Mary receives official status of parish and is assigned its first pastor, Rev. Peter A. Smith, who builds a rectory and serves the community for five years. The next eleven years the young parish was under the direction of Revs. Francis J. Lenihan (1862), Richard O’Gorman, Thomas Drea (1867).

In 1869 the first church of Bridgeport, St. James, (established in 1842, one year before the establishment of the Dioceses of Hartford) is replaced with San Augustine Church. 
On July 6, 1873, Rev. John F. Rogers takes Rev. Drea place as pastor for the next 29 years. During his tenure as spiritual director, the parish grew into one of the most important parishes of the Hartford Diocese. In June 1874 Rev. Rogers began to build the red brick, Romanesque-style church. On May 16, 1875, the first cornerstone is placed and on October 14, 1877, Bishop Thomas Galberry, 4th Bishop of the Dioceses of Hartford, dedicates the new St. Mary.

After the construction of the church Rev. Rogers converts the old little white wooden frame church into a St. Mary Private School with more than 200 children at a cost of $3 per month. It was the first catholic school in the city. Rev. Rogers brings the first order of nuns “Sisters of Mercy” to teach; they stayed as long as the school lasted.

The cost of the construction was approximately $100,000. In 1881 Rogers built the rectory next to the church, and before the end of the century he renovated the interior of the church and purchased land for the building of a school and convent.

Rogers, not in good health, turn over the projects to his administrator. In 1901 the cornerstone for the school, opposite the church, was laid. Rogers died in May 1902. Rev. William H. Lynch, as administrator, completed the school and convent and later opens a new church, St. Charles, and becomes its first pastor. In the early 1900s immigrants from Italy start coming in and the church became primarily an Italian parish.

Rev. John F. Murphy, who was Rev. Rogers’s associate, returns as pastor in November 1902, and on April 19, 1917, Rev. Matthew J. Traynor is appointed pastor; together they built up a fully equipped parish plant.

Priest M. Ernest Wilson arrived at St. Mary on September 18, 1924. He founded the Holy Name teams of Basketball and Baseball, which continued until WW II. He and the Waltersville School principal introduced the early dismissal of catholic students to attend religious classes. In the early 1920s Rev. Traynor had renewed the interior of the church and in October 1927, Rev. Wilson and his assistants started plans for the Golden Jubilee of the parish, but the church caught fire and was destroyed on the eve of the celebration. In rebuilding the church, Rev. Wilson introduced many changes, fireproof features were installed and the sanctuary enlarged. The spire was destroyed by the fire. Altars of choice Italian marble replaced the previous wooden altar The church was re-dedicated on June 24, 1928 by the 7th and 8th bishops of Hartford, John J. Nilan and Maurice McAuliff. During the depression, Rev. Wilson provided food and shelter for many families, many times providing from his personal means. 
The next pastor, Rev. Paul F. Keating, was to serve St. Mary during the Depression years 1930 34. He was succeeded by the Rev. Leo M. Finn who, shortly after arriving was to become Monsignor and capelin of the Knights of Columbus.

In June 1939 Rev. James H. Killian became the 11th pastor of St. Mary; he died in February 1941.   
Rev. Michael J. Kearney came to St. Mary on March 28, 1941, as pastor and in his 13 years finishes the renovations and plans that Rev. Killian started, and later celebrated the Centennial. Immigrants from Puerto Rico came to the city.

1953 The Diocese of Bridgeport is established and the  Monsignor Lawrence Shehan from Baltimore is named Bishop. Rev. Richard F. Dunn is assigned on May 20, 1954, as successor of Rev. Killian, but in October is transferred to Fairfield, being replaced by Rev. Bartholomew J. O’Shea, who was born in the parish,. The interior is renovated, and new stained glass windows installed. The lighting is improved.

In 1956 Bishop Shehan assigns Revs. Francis Campagnone and Victor Torres Frías to start a Hispanic Apostolate in the Diocese. Rev. Victor Torres-Friás, the first Hispanic priest in the diocese, and Rev. Holbrook, later assigned to the parish, are ordained at St. Mary as part of the a957 centenary celebrations.

In 1973 Rev. Torres- Friás is named secretary to Cardinal Aponte of Puerto Rico and Rev. J. Peter Cullen assumes the position of pastor.

Due to economic reasons and after realizing the most of the students in the schools were non-catholic, in March 1973-74 the diocese consolidated the schools of St. Mary, St. Cyril and Blessed Sacrament. After evaluation of the three buildings it is decided that Blessed Sacrament School building is in the best conditions and needs less renovation. St. Cyril drops out and does not join St. Mary and Blessed Sacrament. The student cost at the time was approximately $100.

In October 1975 Rev. Torres- Friás is named Monsignor. In June 1977 the Rev. Mr. Frank Wissel is assigned to St. Mary to work as a deacon and on September 10, 1977, is ordained priest.

The Diocese, realizing the burden of Catholic Schools on parishes that are straggling, in September 1977 takes over the schools of Blessed Sacrament and St. Cyril and combines them, with tuition fees of approximately $175 per student.

Rev. Cullen and the Parish Council decided in June 1975 to close the church during the day for security. During this year Rev. Holbrook is assigned to the parish as Rev. Cullen assistant. The financial position of the parish is not good; in 1979 the school building is sold to the city of Bridgeport for $155,970.12. Before the end of the year Rev. J. Peter Cullen is appointed to St. Peter Church in Bridgeport. Before the end of the twentieth century the Church is primarily Hispanic, with most parishioners coming from Puerto Rico.

On Sunday, January 6, 1980, Rev. Matthew Bernelli is installed as pastor of St. Mary. Bernelli, fluent in Spanish, is a native of Mondavi, Cuneo, Italy. He was ordained in Rome in 1964. He spent nine years working in Guatemala, Panama, El Salvador and Mexico before going to the United States. A Somascan Priest he is accepted into the Diocese on June 5, 1974 and incardinated into Diocese, therefore relieving him of his Somacan duties on August 31, 1979. Before arriving at St. Mary he was assistant pastor at St. Raphael in Bridgeport, St. Joseph in South Norwalk and St. Ambrose in Bridgeport. The church had financial problems, including deterioration due to lack of maintenance over the years. After evaluation and consultation with the Parish Council it was found that building a new church was cheaper than renovating; plans are made. To avoid interrupting services the Parish Hall is converted to a temporary Church and Masses are started on November 16, 1980 while plans are made to demolish and rebuild the church. The old rectory is also rebuilt. In February 1981 Rev. Bernelli and his associate Rev. Francis Torras move into their new residence, 25 Sherman St.

On March 28, 1982 Bishop Walter Curtis gives permission for the demolition of the old brick church, so long as half the cost of building the new church is raised beforehand. The stone of the church and the stained glass windows are preserved; what cannot be used in the new church is sold.

In August 1982 Rev. Francis Torras who has been in the parish long before Rev. Bernelli arrived retires, and resident priest Rev. James Breen is appointed from 8/27/1982 to July 15, 1983. Also during this year the Spanish Apostolate celebrates its 25 Anniversary.

Bernelli and his Building Committee arrange various festivals, dances, concerts, and raffles. The Rev. Paul F. Merry is appointed associate on April 26, 1985. A mosaic is installed.

Bishop Curtis is replaced (12/8/1988) by Bishop Edward Egan, later Cardinal of New York.

June 17, 1989, Rev. Merry is appointed pastor and Rev. J. Bruce Lincon, is appoint (6/23/1989) associate of St. Mary, until March 9, 1990, when he is replaced by Rev. Rodrigo Velazquez, who stays until April 27, 1991. On June 7, 1991, Rev. Joseph "Skip" Karcsinski joined the parish.

Construction of the New St. Mary Church is completed and dedication is held on July 17, 1988. It was decided that the facade of the church would represent Latin America by portraying the patron saint of Latin America, Our Lady of Guadalupe, flanked by the birth and crucifixion of  Jesus.

This modern church dates from 1982 and was designed by Antinozzi Associates of Stamford, CT. The exterior of the church is decorated with mosaics that reflect the Spanish culture and tradition of the parishioners.

References

External links 
 St. Mary - Diocesan information 
 St. Mary - Website
 Diocese of Bridgeport

Roman Catholic churches completed in 1982
Roman Catholic churches in Bridgeport, Connecticut
Roman Catholic Diocese of Bridgeport
1982 establishments in Connecticut
20th-century Roman Catholic church buildings in the United States